The Bishop's House, located at 1 Lower Albert Road, Central, is the residence and office of the Archbishop of Hong Kong.

History
It was originally designed as a school for Chinese students and for many years housed St Paul's College. The house's origins can be dated from 1843, when Vincent Stanton was appointed Colonial Chaplain of Hong Kong. The building was completed in 1848. When the new Diocese of Victoria was created, Stanton handed over the college property to the newly appointed Bishop, George Smith.

The Bishop's House is an imposing building, both in design and proportions. The interior of the building was completely renovated and modernised in 1967–1968. It has been listed as a Grade I historic building.

See also

Central and Western Heritage Trail
List of Grade I historic buildings in Hong Kong

External links

 Hong Kong Sheng Kung Hui
 

Government Hill
Grade I historic buildings in Hong Kong